Minim Island Shell Midden (38GE46) is a historic midden and archaeological site located near Georgetown, Georgetown County, South Carolina. The site consists of prehistoric midden deposits of shellfish remains, floral and faunal remains, and interred human burials. Cultural materials in the form of ceramics and lithics occur throughout the midden.  These deposits are concentrated for a distance of about 100 feet along the shoreline of the Intracoastal Waterway.

This shell midden was listed on the National Register of Historic Places in 1982.

References

Archaeological sites on the National Register of Historic Places in South Carolina
National Register of Historic Places in Georgetown County, South Carolina
Buildings and structures in Georgetown County, South Carolina